Lynn Lake is a town in the northwest region of Manitoba, Canada, approximately  from Winnipeg. The town is the fourth-largest town in Manitoba in terms of land area. It is centred on the original urban community of Lynn Lake. The town was named after Lynn Smith, chief engineer of Sherritt Gordon Mines Ltd. There are many outfitters in the Lynn Lake area, offering services for most wilderness experiences, including sport fishing and bear and moose hunting.

History
Lynn Lake was founded in 1950, when a deposit of nickel ore was discovered. The nickel mine was developed, and soon after, gold was also discovered. Most of Lynn Lake's 208 houses and commercial buildings were moved from the town of Sherridon, 120 miles south, over cat train trails. The buildings were moved by digging out the foundations and loading them onto tricycle winter-freighting sleighs pulled by Linn tractors and caterpillar crawlers. The buildings were loaded onto the last sleigh on each cat train, which were usually 4–5 sleighs long.

After a rich vein of copper ore had been nearly depleted in Sherridon, the company sent out prospectors to find another strike. Around 1945, the expeditions were successful when one of the world's largest nickel strikes was found near the soon-to-be-established Lynn Lake. Most of the people of Sherridon moved to Lynn Lake when housing was completed.

Gold mining was once the major industry of the town. The mine was shut down in the late 20th century, but if the price of gold and other metals rises enough, mining operations could be resumed.

Demographics 

Statistics Canada amended the 2011 census results to a population of 674 living in 246 of its 386 total dwellings, a −5.6% change from 2006.

In 2001, the population of Lynn Lake was 699, a −32.7% change from its 1996 population of 1,038.

Attractions
Burge Lake Provincial Park and Zed Lake Provincial Park are nearby.

Transportation
The town is served by Lynn Lake Airport and Manitoba Provincial Road 391. There is a functional rail line between Lynn Lake and The Pas. The rail line is owned by Keewatin Railway and is inactive between Pukatawagan and Lynn Lake.

Notable people
Canadian musician, writer, and Officer in the Order of Canada Tom Cochrane was born in Lynn Lake and lived there until he was four years old. On October 31, 2016, he announced a return to Lynn Lake for a live performance, scheduled for August 20, 2017. The announcement was made from the Manitoba Legislature as part of a ceremony that announced the renaming of Manitoba Provincial Road 391 from Thompson, MB, to Lynn Lake as the "Life Is A Highway", in commemoration of the 25th anniversary of Cochrane's best-selling album Mad Mad World.

Lynn Johnston, award-winning cartoonist and creator of the comic strip For Better or For Worse, also lived for a number of years in Lynn Lake, where she began her career.

Climate
Lynn Lake experiences a subarctic climate (Köppen Dfc), with long, severely cold winters and short, mild to warm, rainy summers.

Local media

Television
CBTA began operation in September 1966 on channel 8. CBTA was a Frontier Coverage Package station with program broadcast on a one-week delay. The station operated 4 hours per day from 6pm to 10pm, 7 days a week. CBTA's antenna, transmitter and video equipment were located at the Lynn Lake post office. In early 1969 the province-wide microwave system replaced the video tape recordings. CBTA became part of the CBC network, rebroadcasting programming from CBW TV in Winnipeg. The transmitter was later moved to the MTS site. CBTA was managed and operated by Ken Crowston from September 1966 until shortly after the station connected to live CBC network.  Lynn Lake has enjoyed live television since then.

 CBWRT Channel 8 (CBC)

Internet
Northwest Communities Cooperative Inc. (NCC), an independent broadband provider, was formed in July 2010. NCC was the first high-speed internet service of its kind to become available to the community, and had been working to accommodate the large demand. The company's list of subscribers had been growing steadily since its formation. NCC was dissolved in September 2011, and the continued operation of high-speed wireless service was transferred to Broadband Communications North. MTS Allstream began to offer DSL Internet service in December 2011 in addition to its dial-up service. Internet is also available through external satellite providers.MTS Allstream Inc. DSL Availability

Print
The Town of Lynn Lake used to publish Lynn Lake Life, a local newsletter, each month. It was available at many local locations in paper format and simultaneously available on-line. Monthly publication was suspended in July 2013 when the editor left the community.

References

External links

Mining communities in Manitoba
Towns in Manitoba